The Bernard Lyot Telescope (Téléscope Bernard Lyot, or TBL) is a 2 m Cassegrain telescope operating in the visible domain, since 1980. It is located at 2877 m elevation on the Pic du Midi in the French Pyrenees. Since 2007, the Bernard Lyot Telescope is housing an echelle spectropolarimeter NARVAL, allowing astronomers to probe stellar magnetic fields to an exquisite sensitivity.

See also
Observatoire Midi-Pyrénées
List of largest optical telescopes in the 20th century

External links

Optical telescopes